Azamat Umarbiyevich Gurfov (born 27 February 1994) is a Russian football player. He plays for FC Kuban Krasnodar.

Club career
He made his professional debut in the Russian Professional Football League for PFC Spartak Nalchik on 12 August 2014 in a game against FC Angusht Nazran. He made his Russian Football National League debut for Spartak Nalchik on 8 March 2017 in a game against FC Dynamo Moscow.

He played in the 2017–18 Russian Cup final for FC Avangard Kursk on 9 May 2018 in the Volgograd Arena against 2–1 winners FC Tosno.

References

External links
 

1994 births
Sportspeople from Kabardino-Balkaria
Living people
Russian footballers
Association football midfielders
PFC Spartak Nalchik players
FC Avangard Kursk players
FC Armavir players
FC Urozhay Krasnodar players
Russian First League players
Russian Second League players